59 West 12th Street is a residential building located in the Greenwich Village Historic District in Lower Manhattan, New York City, United States.

It was built by the developer brothers Bing & Bing with noted architect Emery Roth whose other work includes The Beresford and The El Dorado.

It was granted an occupancy license on August 7, 1931 and houses 101 condominium apartments.

Development 
It was part of a simultaneous development of five buildings in the area.

Bing and Bing also used Roth to design 299 West 12th Street.

They worked with the architectural firm of Boak and Paris on both 302 West 12th Street and 45 Christopher Street.

And they chose to work with architect Robert T. Lyons on 2 Horatio Street.

Rivaling Central Park West 
Leo Bing announced on April 1, 1929 that his firm had quietly acquired 75 small lots and old buildings largely around Abingdon Square, Sheridan Square and Jackson Square Park. And the lots would be combined to allow for a set of larger-scale, 17-story apartment buildings.

He said his goal was to "recreate the entire district as a modern counterpart of the high-class residential section it once was" saying it would "rival Central Park West and the fashionable east side within a few years." He cited the goal of neighborhood reinvention as the reason for the simultaneous building, saying his hope was that "complete transformation of the section may be achieved as quickly as possible."

Despite the start of the Great Depression just months after Leo Bing's announcement, by September 1931, Bing & Bing reported that the "five new buildings on Christopher, Horatio and West Twelfth Streets are proving among the most popular of all the Bing & Bing apartment properties. Callers have been numerous … and a high percentage of the space has been leased."

Notable residents 
Once the home of:
 Cameron Diaz – actress
 Jimi Hendrix - singer, songwriter, guitarist 
 John Lardner, sports writer
 Isaac Mizrahi – designer
 Bebe Neuwirth – actress/dancer
 Jonathan Pryce – actor
 John Waters – director
 Lena Dunham - actress
 Bruce Bozzi - restaurant owner
 Bryan Lourd - talent agent
 Larry Dvoskin - songwriter/musician
 Ben Wauford - architect

References

External links 
 Emporis listing.

Residential buildings completed in 1931
Apartment buildings in New York City
Residential buildings in Manhattan
Condominiums and housing cooperatives in Manhattan
Greenwich Village
Art Deco architecture in Manhattan
Emery Roth buildings